Provincial road N704 (N704) is a road connecting N305 near Almere with N301 near Nijkerk.

External links

704
704